Jericó is the Portuguese, Catalan, and Spanish form of Jericho, a city in the West Bank. Jericó or Jerico may also refer to:

Places and jurisdictions 
 South America
 Jericó, Antioquia, a municipality in the department of Antioquia, Colombia
 Roman Catholic Diocese of Jericó, with see in the above city
 Jericó, Boyacá, a municipality in the department of Boyacá, Colombia
 Jericó, Paraíba, a municipality in the state of Paraíba, Brazil
 North America
 Jerico River, located in the U.S. state of Georgia

People 
 Jericó Abramo Masso (born 1975), Mexican politician affiliated with the Institutional Revolutionary Party
 Jerico Nelson (born 1989), American football strong safety

See also 
 Jericho (disambiguation)
 Jerricho, name
 Jerico Springs, Missouri, a village in Cedar County, Missouri, United States